Augustine Beach is an unincorporated community in New Castle County, Delaware, United States. Augustine Beach is located on the west bank of the Delaware River along Delaware Route 9, northeast of Odessa.

References

Unincorporated communities in New Castle County, Delaware
Unincorporated communities in Delaware
Beaches of Delaware